Sterling High School is a public secondary school in Sterling, Kansas, United States operated by Sterling USD 376 school district.  It serves students of grades 7 to 12 in the communities of Sterling, Alden, Saxman, and nearby rural areas.

Athletics
Athletic programs offered at Sterling High School include American football, cross country, volleyball, tennis, track and field, golf, softball, basketball, cheerleading, wrestling, and the recently added baseball.

Other Activities
Other extracurricular activities offered are debate, forensics, choir, band, musicals/plays, FBLA, FCCLA, and FFA.

See also
 List of high schools in Kansas
 List of unified school districts in Kansas

References

External links
 Official school website
 USD 376, school district
 Sterling city map, KDOT

Public high schools in Kansas
Schools in Rice County, Kansas